Christoph Georg Hartmann (born 21 May 1972 in Essen) is a  German politician who is a member of the FDP. From 10 November 2009 until 18 January 2012 he was the secretary to the Minister-president of Saarland and the Saarland Minister for Economy and Science.

Education and Profession 
After leaving school in 1991 he completed his military service, and then trained as a Bank Manager. He studied Business Administration in Vienna, Munich and Saarbrücken, gaining his diploma in 2000. 2006 he gained his PhD in Information Science from Saarland University.

Political career 
In 1992 Hartmann joined the FDP. Initially he was involved in the Young Liberals, of which he was regional chair from 1997 to 1999. Between 1996 until 2005 he was the Chairman of the Homburg local party of the FDP. After serving as General Secretary of the Saarland FDP from 1998 to 2002, he was elected Chairman of the regional party. On 9 November 2010 he resigned this position. From 1999 he has served on the FDP national board.

Elected Positions
From 2002 until his resignation on 1 November 2004, Hartmann was a member of the German National Parliament (Bundestag). Here he was at this time educational policy spokesman of the FDP parliamentary group. He was the Saarland FDP representative in the Bundestag for eight years.

Hartmann resigned his seat in the national parliament, since he had been elected to the Regional Parliament of Saarland in 2004 where he served as chairman of the FDP parliamentary group.

From 10 November 2009 to 18 January 2012 he was Minister of Economics and Science of Saarland and Deputy Prime Minister in the first Jamaica coalition at state level.

Personal life 
Christoph Hartmann is married with two children and lives in Dudweiler.

References

External links 
Biografie, Landtag des Saarlandes
Christoph Hartmann - Profile at the Bundestag Website

1972 births
Living people
Saarland University alumni
Members of the Landtag of Saarland
Members of the Bundestag for Saarland
Members of the Bundestag 2002–2005
Members of the Bundestag for the Free Democratic Party (Germany)